In probability theory and statistics, a shape parameter (also known as form parameter) is a kind of numerical parameter of a parametric family of probability distributions
that is neither a location parameter nor a scale parameter (nor a function of these, such as a rate parameter). Such a parameter must affect the shape of a distribution rather than simply shifting it (as a location parameter does) or stretching/shrinking it (as a scale parameter does).
For example, "peakedness" refers to how round the main peak is.

Estimation
Many estimators measure location or scale; however, estimators for shape parameters also exist. Most simply, they can be estimated in terms of the higher moments, using the method of moments, as in the skewness (3rd moment) or kurtosis (4th moment), if the higher moments are defined and finite. Estimators of shape often involve higher-order statistics (non-linear functions of the data), as in the higher moments, but linear estimators also exist, such as the L-moments. Maximum likelihood estimation can also be used.

Examples
The following continuous probability distributions have a shape parameter:
 Beta distribution
 Burr distribution
 Dagum distribution
 Erlang distribution
 ExGaussian distribution
 Exponential power distribution
 Fréchet distribution
 Gamma distribution
 Generalized extreme value distribution
 Log-logistic distribution
 Log-t distribution
 Inverse-gamma distribution
 Inverse Gaussian distribution
 Pareto distribution
 Pearson distribution
 Skew normal distribution
 Lognormal distribution
 Student's t-distribution
 Tukey lambda distribution
 Weibull distribution
By contrast, the following continuous distributions do not have a shape parameter, so their shape is fixed and only their location or their scale or both can change. It follows that (where they exist) the skewness and kurtosis of these distribution  are constants, as skewness and kurtosis are independent of location and scale parameters.
 Exponential distribution
 Cauchy distribution
 Logistic distribution
 Normal distribution
 Raised cosine distribution
 Uniform distribution
 Wigner semicircle distribution

See also
 Skewness
 Kurtosis
 Location parameter

References

Statistical parameters